Durrants Hotel is located in George Street, London.

Established in 1789, the hotel has been owned by the Miller family since 1921 and is one of the last remaining privately owned hotels in London. The building has 92 rooms, and several houses have been incorporated into the building's structure. It is located opposite the Wallace Collection art galleries.

It is a grade II listed building.

External links 
  Durrants Hotel

https://www.standard.co.uk/escapist/travel/durrants-hotel-marylebone-london-review-a3636861.html
 https://www.latimes.com/archives/la-xpm-1991-08-04-tr-93-story.html

1789 establishments in England
Hotels in London
Grade II listed hotels
Grade II listed buildings in the City of Westminster